This is a list of rulers and office-holders of Djibouti.

Heads of state 
Heads of state of Djibouti

Heads of government 
Heads of government of Djibouti

Colonial governors 
Colonial heads of Djibouti (French Somaliland) (Afars and Issas)

See also 
Lists of office-holders

Lists of African rulers